The Super Bowl Indicator is a spurious correlation that says that the stock market's performance in a given year can be predicted based on the outcome of the Super Bowl of that year. It was "discovered" by Leonard Koppett in 1978 when he realized that it had never been wrong, until that point.  This pseudo-macroeconomic concept states that if a team from the American Football Conference (AFC) wins, then it will be a bear market (or down market), but if a team from the National Football Conference (NFC) or a team that was in the NFL before the NFL/AFL merger wins, it will be a bull market (up market).

As of January 2022, the predictor has been right 41 out of 55 games, a 75% success rate. Without retrospective predictions, i.e. after its invention in 1978, it had been correct in 29 out of 43 games, a success rate of 67%.

Data

See also
January barometer
Calendar effect

References

Business terms